Kallur may refer to:

Places in India 
 Kallur, Chittoor, town in the Chittoor district of Andhra Pradesh
 Kallur, Thrissur, Kallur is a small village in Thrissur district of Kerala, southwest India
 Kallur, Tumkur, town in the Tumkur district of Karnataka
 Kallur, Belgaum, Karnataka
 Kallur, Dharwad, Karnataka
 Kallur, Palakkad, village in Palakkad district in Kerala
 Kallur, Khammam district, census town in Khammam district in the Indian state of Andhra Pradesh
 Kallur, Kurnool district, town in the Kurnool district of Andhra Pradesh
 Kallur, Kumbakonam, Thanjavur district, Tamil Nadu
 Kallur archaeological site in the Raichur district of Karnataka state
 Kallur, Pudukkottai, village in the Arimalamrevenue block of Pudukkottai district, Tamil Nadu, India
 Kallur, Punjab, town and union council of Mianwali District in the Punjab province of Pakistan
 Kallur, Yelburga, also spelled as Kallooru, village in the Yelburga taluk of Koppal district in the Indian state of Karnataka

People 
 Anders Kallur (born 1952), professional ice-hockey player
 Susanna Kallur (born 1981), Swedish hurdler
 Jenny Kallur (born 1981), Swedish hurdler and sprinter
 Kallur Subba Rao (1897–1972), Indian activist and politician
 Shalil Kallur, Indian film director, producer, and screenwriter for Malayalam language films

See also

Kallu (name)